Jean-Marie Kouassi (born 3 March 1975) is an Ivorian footballer. He played in six matches for the Ivory Coast national football team from 1995 to 1997. He was also named in Ivory Coast's squad for the 1996 African Cup of Nations tournament.

References

1975 births
Living people
Ivorian footballers
Ivory Coast international footballers
1996 African Cup of Nations players
Place of birth missing (living people)
Association football defenders